The Hôtel du Lac (English: Lake Hotel) is a hotel in Tunis.  The building was designed in the Brutalist style by the Italian architect Raffaele Contigiani and built from 1970 to 1973 for the Tunisian government of Habib Bourguiba.

Location

Construction and design
Projecting cantilevered stairs at each end create an inverted pyramid shape. The 416 bedrooms are mostly on the upper floors, with the top floor twice as long as the ground floor. The interior décor reflected the 1970s, with floors covered by linoleum and a colour palette of brown, orange and red.

The striking design, departing from traditional Arab and European architecture, made the hotel a symbol of modernism in Tunis.  It remains an important example of Brutalism in North Africa. Its distinctive shape has prompted comparisons with the sandcrawler vehicle of the Star Wars films.

Recent history
The hotel was privatised in the 1990, but it fell into disrepair and closed in 2000.  It was bought by the Libyan Arab Foreign Investment Company (LAFICO) in 2013, which proposed demolishing the building and spending up to $100m to replace it with a new five-star hotel tower.  Concerns about imminent demolition were raised again in 2019.

References and sources
References

Sources
LAFICO to Develop Tunisian Resort, Libya-businessnews.com, 26 November 2013
Tunisia's high-flying Brutalist hotel is safe after demolition scare, The Architects Newspaper, 13 March 2019 
The inspiration for Star Wars' Sandcrawler, Hôtel du Lac, faces imminent demolition, Archinect News, 27 March 2019 
Raffaele Contigiani: Hôtel du Lac, 1970–1973, sosbrutalism.org
Hôtel du Lac, World Monuments Fund

External links

Brutalist architecture in Africa
Defunct hotels
Hotel buildings completed in 1973
Hotels in Tunis
Inverted pyramids